Jenny Anderson Horne (born October 12, 1972) is an American attorney and politician who served as a member of the South Carolina House of Representatives from 2009 to 2017. She is a Republican.

Early life and education
Jenny Anderson Horne, the daughter of John D. Anderson, Jr. and Cynthia W. Anderson, was born on October 12, 1972 in Dorchester County, South Carolina. She earned a Bachelor of Arts degree in English and Juris Doctor from the University of South Carolina.

Career
Horne is an attorney. A member of the Republican Party, she served as a member of the South Carolina House of Representatives from 2009 until 2017. In a 2015 speech on the South Carolina State House floor, Horne claimed to be a "descendant of Jefferson Davis."  Subsequent media reports explained this to be the Confederate States President Jefferson Davis.  Horne advocated the quick removal of the Confederate Battle Flag from the grounds of the state capitol.

Reportedly, Rep. Horne never researched her claim of descent from Davis, but was told of it by her grandfather. This was disclosed as her connection to Davis came under scrutiny. In response, Rep. Horne indicated she was not inclined to research the claim.

It was reported in July 2015 that Horne was considering a challenge of U.S. Rep. Mark Sanford for the 1st District congressional seat. During the 2016 primary campaign, Sanford had a significant fund raising advantage.

In the June 2016 debate with Mark Sanford, Horne acknowledged the results of grassroots genealogical researchers findings that she is not descended from the Confederate President Jefferson Davis, born 1808 in Kentucky.  Her line goes back to a James Jefferson Davis, born about 1841 in Georgia.Horne's primary challenge came up short in June, 2016, although she polled stronger than expected with Sanford receiving 56% of the vote to Horne's 44%.

Personal life
Horne's husband, Marc F. Horne, is a realtor. They were married on May 11, 1996. They have two children.

References

External links

Ballotpedia

Living people
South Carolina lawyers
Republican Party members of the South Carolina House of Representatives
University of South Carolina alumni
1972 births
People from Summerville, South Carolina
Women state legislators in South Carolina
20th-century American lawyers
21st-century American lawyers
21st-century American politicians
21st-century American women politicians
Candidates in the 2016 United States elections
20th-century American women